Berndorf is a municipality in the district of Salzburg-Umgebung in the state of Salzburg in Austria.

Geography
The municipality lies in the northeast of the district of Salzburg-Umgebung. The Grabensee lies entirely within the municipality. Katastralgemeinden are: Berndorf bei Salzburg and Großenegg.

See also
 Salzburg
 Salzburgerland

References

Cities and towns in Salzburg-Umgebung District